Giovanni Cocco (1 June 1921 – 7 January 2007) was an Italian weightlifter. He competed in the men's featherweight event at the 1952 Summer Olympics.

References

1921 births
2007 deaths
Italian male weightlifters
Olympic weightlifters of Italy
Weightlifters at the 1952 Summer Olympics
Sportspeople from Cagliari
World Wrestling Championships medalists
20th-century Italian people